Donaldsonville High School (DHS), is a public high school in Donaldsonville, Louisiana, United States. It is within the Ascension Parish School Board.

The current (2013–present) principal is Marvin Evans. The Associate Principal is Nicole Joseph. There are two Assistant Principals: Julian Surla and O'Neil Robinson. The school mascot is the tiger, and the school colors are red and black.

Principals

 L.C. Ferrell  1885-1889 
 G.C. Cole  1889-1890 
 A. W. Meadows  1890-1892 
 M. Knobloch  1892-1893 
 Wm. J. Gahan  1893-1895 
 R.N. Sims  1895-1898 
 J.O. Taylor  1989-1902 
 J.L. Rusca  1902-1909 
 Arnold Pearce  1909-1910 
 J.H. Dupy  1910-1911 
 H.B. Messick  1911-1912 
 A.J. Dupy  1912 
 R.S. Vickers  1912-1914 
 W.H. Miller  1914-1915 
 R.S. Vickers  1915-1919 
 B.C. Alwes  1919-1951 
 C.C. Goette  1951-1965 
 Keith Falcon  1965-1973 
 John Oubre  1973-1977 
 Violet Marchand  1977-1980 
 Emile Chiquet  1981-1993 
 Gerald Alexander  1993-1998 
 Ronald Rabalais  1999-2008 
 Gwen Boudreaux  2008-2010
 Dr. Esrom Pitre 2010-2013
 Marvin Evans   2013–present

Athletics
Donaldsonville High athletics competes in the LHSAA in class 3A.

Championships
Football championships
(1) State Championship: 1954

Football
Current head coach : Brian RichardsonCurrent Assistant Coaches: Brian Richardson, Cornelius White (non-staff), Jason Worley (non-staff)

Notable alumni
 Gerald Alexander, former MLB player (Texas Rangers)
 Melvin Irvin, Lowery High School grad, state representative for District 58 from 1984 to 1992

References

External links
 

Public high schools in Louisiana
Schools in Ascension Parish, Louisiana
Donaldsonville, Louisiana